William Stanley Dwinnell (December 25, 1862 – March 9, 1930) was a member of the Minnesota Senate and the Minnesota House of Representatives.

Biography
Dwinnell was born on Christmas of 1862 in Lodi, Wisconsin. He began attending the University of Wisconsin-Madison in 1884 and graduated from the University of Wisconsin Law School in 1886.

In April 1889, Dwinnell married Virginia Ingman. They had three children. He died on March 9, 1930, in Pasadena, California.

Career
Dwinnell was a member of the House of Representatives from 1899 to 1900 and of the Senate from 1911 to 1918. Previously, he was County Attorney of Jackson County, Wisconsin, from 1888 to 1889. He was a Republican.

References

People from Lodi, Wisconsin
People from Jackson County, Wisconsin
Republican Party Minnesota state senators
Republican Party members of the Minnesota House of Representatives
Wisconsin lawyers
Wisconsin Republicans
University of Wisconsin–Madison alumni
University of Wisconsin Law School alumni
1862 births
1930 deaths